Bygdeå is a locality situated in Robertsfors Municipality, Västerbotten County, Sweden with 502 inhabitants in 2010.

Transportations are reliable via the European route E4.

The town name is first traced from 1314, as the name of Bygdeå Court District.

History
One of the last battles of Finnish War between Russia and Sweden was fought south of Bygdeå in March 1809. In the churchyard, there is a replica of the funeral monument to a Russian officer, Semyon Gotovtsov, who was killed in combat.

Culture and recreation
The Bygdeå Church was built in 1539 and is located next to the Storbäcken Stream.

References 

Populated places in Robertsfors Municipality